Dharma Vira OBE, ICS (20 January 1906 – 16 September 2000) was an Indian civil servant and politician who served as the governor of Punjab, Haryana, West Bengal and Karnataka. Vira also served as a Cabinet Secretary of the Government of India.

Early life
Dharma Vira was born in Bijnor on 20 January 1906, the son of Raja Jwala Prasad and Bhagyati Devi.  He studied at Muir Central College in Allahabad, before going to London to read for the ICS examinations at the School of Oriental Studies (now the School of Oriental and African Studies) between 1929 and 1930.  He passed the examinations in October 1930, and returned to India in November.

He married Dayavati Ganga Ram in 1932. He was a resident magistrate in Uttar Pradesh, but from 1941 became more involved in central Indian government affairs.

Career 
He became Deputy Chief Controller of Imports during the Second World War, and was Textile Commissioner for India in 1945. He was appointed an OBE in the 1946 New Year Honours.

After Independence, he worked closely with Jawaharlal Nehru, and was Joint Secretary to the Indian Cabinet in 1947. He then became Principal Private Secretary to Jawaharlal Nehru, 1950–51, and Commercial Adviser to the Indian High Commissioner in London, 1951–3.

In 1954, he was appointed Ambassador to Czechoslovakia, in which capacity he served until 1956. On his return to India he served as Secretary to the Ministry of Rehabilitation until 1962 and was Secretary to the Ministry of Works, Housing and Supply in 1962.

From 1963 to 1964 he was Chief Commissioner of Delhi and then from 1964 to 1966 Cabinet Secretary and Secretary to Union Council of Ministers and became Chairman of the Atomic Energy Commission.

He served as Governor of:

 Punjab and Haryana, 1966-67
 West Bengal 1967-69
 Karnataka (Mysore),1969–72

and was Chairman of the National Police Commission, 1977–83. Dharam Vira served as the President of the Bharat Scouts and Guides from November 1973 to September 1976.

Awards 
He was awarded the Padma Vibhushan, the second-highest Indian civilian award, by the Government of India in 1999. He died on 16 September 2000.

References

External links

http://www.bsgindia.org/

Indian civil servants
Recipients of the Padma Vibhushan in civil service
People from Patiala
University of Allahabad alumni
Governors of Karnataka
Governors of Haryana
Governors of Punjab, India
Governors of West Bengal
Scouting and Guiding in India
Indian Officers of the Order of the British Empire
Indian Civil Service (British India) officers
1906 births
2000 deaths
Cabinet Secretaries of India